Miklós Hanó (born 6 February 1957) is a Hungarian politician, member of the National Assembly (MP) from Békés County Regional List from 2010 to 2014. He also served as Member of Parliament between 1998 and 2002.

Career
He graduated from Vocational Secondary School of Food Industry in Szeged. He took his state examination in the College of Food Industry in 1978. He worked as manager of the Körös-Food Ltd. for five years. He was the Chief Engineer of Production at the Húsker Company in Békéscsaba.

Hanó joined the Independent Smallholders, Agrarian Workers and Civic Party (FKGP) in 1993. He served as chairman of the party's Békéscsaba branch from 1993 to 2001. He is also a member of the MAGOSZ. He is a representative in the Békéscsaba Assembly since 1994. He also served as head of the FKGP in Békés County between 1994 and 1998. He left the party in 2001 when the FKGP collapsed and the coalition broke up with the Fidesz (led by PM Viktor Orbán). Hanó was a founding member and chairman of the Hungarian Smallholders and Civic Party (MKPP) since 2001. He served as Deputy Chairman of the Parliamentary Committee on Agriculture between October 16, 2001 and  May 14, 2002. The MKPP became supporter of the Fidesz.

He is a member of the Self-defense Movement of Hungarian Farmers and Consumers (MAGFÖM) since 2003. He is a current Deputy Mayor of Békéscsaba since 2006. He became a member of the Fidesz in 2009. Currently he is a leading member of the Smallholders' Civil Alliance (KPE-KPSZ; Fidesz-ally). During the 2010 parliamentary elections, he became MP again after 8 years from Békés County Regional List. He was a member of the Committee on Agriculture. He ran as candidate of Fidesz for the mayoral seat of Békéscsaba during the 2014 local elections, however lost to independent politician Péter Szarvas.

Personal life
He is married and has two children.

References

1957 births
Living people
Hungarian businesspeople
Independent Smallholders, Agrarian Workers and Civic Party politicians
Fidesz politicians
Members of the National Assembly of Hungary (1998–2002)
Members of the National Assembly of Hungary (2010–2014)
People from Békéscsaba